Marripalem is a neighbourhood area in Visakhapatnam. It is a residential area in the city. It has many population settlements with high raised buildings and apartments.

Commercial Area
Marripalem is a commercial center with many kinds of shops, markets, and hospitals.

Transport
There is a railway quarters and a passenger halt station. Ordinary trains do not halt at this station. It is very near to Visakhapatnam railway station. Now it  will develop as a terminal station. Marripalem is a part of BRTS corridor from Dwaraka bus station to Pendurthi.

Gallery

References 

Neighbourhoods in Visakhapatnam